The 1866 Michigan gubernatorial election was held on November 6, 1866. Incumbent Republican Henry H. Crapo defeated Democratic nominee Alpheus S. Williams with 58.59% of the vote.

General election

Candidates
Major party candidates
Henry H. Crapo, Republican
Alpheus S. Williams, Democratic

Results

References

1866
Michigan
Gubernatorial
November 1866 events